Richard Dale Murray (born July 6, 1957) is a former first baseman in Major League Baseball who played for the San Francisco Giants in its 1980 and 1983 seasons. Listed at 6' 4", 195 lb., he batted and threw right handed.

Born in Los Angeles, California, Murray was selected by the Giants in the sixth round of the 1975 MLB Draft.

In a two-season career, Murray hit a slash line of .216/.256/.333 with four home runs, 19 runs scored, and 25 RBI in 57 games played.

Personal
His elder brother, Eddie Murray, also played in the majors.

Sources
, or Retrosheet
Pelota Binaria (Venezuelan Winter League)

1957 births
Living people
African-American baseball players
Cardenales de Lara players
American expatriate baseball players in Venezuela
Cedar Rapids Giants players
Charleston Charlies players
Great Falls Giants players
Major League Baseball infielders
Omaha Royals players
Phoenix Giants players
San Francisco Giants players
Wichita Aeros players
21st-century African-American people
20th-century African-American sportspeople